The 1982 Holiday Bowl was a college football bowl game played December 17, 1982, in San Diego, California. It was part of the 1982 NCAA Division I-A football season. It featured the 17th ranked Ohio State Buckeyes, and the unranked BYU Cougars.

Scoring summary
Ohio State scored first on a 47-yard field goal by Rich Spangler, giving the Buckeyes a 3–0 first quarter lead. In the second quarter, BYU quarterback Steve Young threw a 7-yard touchdown pass to Neil Balholm giving BYU a 7–3 lead. Ohio State running back Tim Spencer scored on a 61-yard touchdown run, giving the Buckeyes a 10–7 lead. Buckeye quarterback Mike Tomczak later scored on a 3-yard run making it 17–7 in favor of the Buckeyes. BYU's Kurt Gunther kicked a 39-yard field goal before halftime to make it 17–10 Ohio State.

In the third quarter, Ohio State's Vaughn Broadnax scored on a 1-yard touchdown run giving OSU a 24–10 lead. Tim Spencer added an 18-yard touchdown run, and Rich Spangler a 37-yard field goal to give Ohio State a 34–10 lead at the end of the third quarter.

In the fourth quarter, Ohio State scored a 1-yard touchdown run going up 41–10. Steve Young fired a 13-yard touchdown pass to Gordon Hudson narrowing the lead to 41–17. However, Gayle scored on a 5-yard touchdown run to respond for the Buckeyes. The Buckeyes had 329 rushing yards, 132 passing yards, while also having 196 yards on return yards, possessing the ball for 34:33 with 24 first downs. BYU had 19 rushing yards, 352 passing yards, 124 return yards, with possession time being 25:27. Both teams lost a fumble, while BYU had a pass intercepted. BYU had 9 penalties for 75 yards; Ohio State had 12 penalties for 109 yards.

References

Holiday Bowl
Holiday Bowl
BYU Cougars football bowl games
Ohio State Buckeyes football bowl games
1982 in sports in California
December 1982 sports events in the United States